Clint Mears (born January 12, 1973) is an American racing driver from Bakersfield, California. Clint is the son of Indy 500 champion Rick Mears and cousin of NASCAR driver Casey Mears. He has retired from automobile racing but currently competes in motocross events.

Career
Clint competed in the Toyota Atlantic championship part-time in 1994 and full-time in 1995. In 1995 he finished 9th in the championship with a best finish of fifth in Toronto. In 1996 he was out of professional racing except for a failed attempt to make his NASCAR debut in a Craftsman Truck Series race at North Wilkesboro Speedway where he failed to qualify. In 1997 he moved to the Indy Lights series where he raced full-time as a teammate to his cousin; he finished eighth in points, scoring victories at the Milwaukee Mile, the same track as his father's first IndyCar win, and at California Speedway. Mears returned to the series in 1998 but missed some races and in the races he did compete in only managed a best finish of eighth. This was the end of his professional racing career; he became a driving instructor at Irwindale Speedway, competing in a NASCAR Winston West Series event there; he intended to return to the Craftsman Truck Series during 2000 or 2001 with Core Motorsports, but a ride did not materialise.

Clint also dabbled in off-road racing and motocross. He returned to amateur motocross in 2012 at the age of 39 after a lengthy absence.

Motorsports career results

NASCAR
(key) (Bold – Pole position awarded by qualifying time. Italics – Pole position earned by points standings or practice time. * – Most laps led.)

Craftsman Truck Series

American open-wheel racing results
(key) (Races in bold indicate pole position) (Races in italics indicate fastest lap)

Indy Lights

References

External links

1973 births
Racing drivers from Bakersfield, California
Indy Lights drivers
NASCAR drivers
Atlantic Championship drivers
Living people